Thelma Alice Todd (July 29, 1906 – December 16, 1935) was an American actress and businesswoman who carried the nicknames "The Ice Cream Blonde" and "Hot Toddy". Appearing in about 120 feature films and shorts  between 1926 and 1935, she is remembered for her comedic roles opposite ZaSu Pitts, and in films such as Marx Brothers' Monkey Business and Horse Feathers and a number of Charley Chase's short comedies. She co-starred with Buster Keaton and Jimmy Durante in Speak Easily. She also had roles in several Wheeler and Woolsey and Laurel and Hardy films, the last of which (The Bohemian Girl) featured her in a part that was cut short by her sudden death in 1935 at the age of 29.

Early life
Todd was born in Lawrence, Massachusetts, to John Shaw Todd, an upholsterer from Ireland, and later, a superintendent of streets, an alderman, and Lawrence's commissioner of health and charities in 1912 and Alice Elizabeth Edwards, an immigrant from Canada. She had an older brother, William, who died in an accident in 1910. She was a bright and successful student. Intending to become a schoolteacher, she enrolled at the Lowell Normal School (now University of Massachusetts, Lowell) after graduating from high school in 1923. As a student, she earned money as a model, entered beauty pageants in her late teens, gained the attention of Elks Lodge 65, was crowned 1925 Miss Lawrence, and won the title of 1925 Miss Massachusetts. While representing her home state, she was spotted by a Hollywood talent scout. She was offered a slot at the Paramount Players School in Astoria, Queens, New York City, at a time when Paramount Studios was training would-be-actors in acting, diction, athletics and manners. Of the 16 members of her cohort, only Charles "Buddy" Rogers also made it to Hollywood. Todd later found work, in 1929, at Hal Roach Studios.

Career

Film 

During the silent film era, Todd appeared in numerous supporting roles that made full use of her beauty but gave her little chance to act. With the advent of the talkies, she was able to expand her roles when producer Hal Roach signed her to appear with comedy stars such as Harry Langdon, Charley Chase, and Laurel and Hardy.

In 1931, Roach cast Todd in her own series of 17-to-27-minute slapstick comedy shorts. Attempt to create a female version of Laurel and Hardy,  Roach teamed Todd with ZaSu Pitts for 17 shorts, from "Let's do Things" (June 1931) through "One Track Minds" (May 1933). When Pitts left in 1933, she was replaced by Patsy Kelly, who appeared with Todd in 21 shorts, from "Beauty and the Bus" (September 1933) through "An All American Toothache" (January 1936). These shorts often cast Todd as a levelheaded working girl doing her best to remain poised and charming despite numerous problems and her ditzy sidekick's embarrassing antics.

In 1931, Todd starred in Corsair, a film directed by Roland West, with whom she become romantically involved.

Todd became highly regarded as a capable film comedian, and Roach loaned her to other studios to play opposite Wheeler & Woolsey, Buster Keaton, Joe E. Brown, and the Marx Brothers. She also successfully appeared in dramas, such as the original 1931 version of The Maltese Falcon starring Ricardo Cortez as Sam Spade, where she played Miles Archer's treacherous widow. She appeared in around 120 feature films and shorts in her career.

Todd continued her short-subject series through 1935 and was featured in the full-length Laurel and Hardy comedy The Bohemian Girl. It was her last role before her untimely death at age 29. Although she had completed all of her scenes, producer Roach had them re-shot, fearing negative publicity. He deleted all of Todd's dialogue, and limited her appearance to one musical number.

Sidewalk Cafe 
Originally built in 1928, by architect Mark Daniels, as the Castellammare housing tract business block, in August 1934, Todd opened, in partnership with Jewel Carmen and Roland West, Thelma Todd's Sidewalk Cafe, at 17575 Pacific Coast Highway, Castellammare, Pacific Palisades, Los Angeles. The ground floor of the building housed the restaurant. On the second floor, Todd and West lived in adjoining ocean-view apartments—with only a sliding wooden door separating their bedrooms—and held parties in the adjacent, private nightclub named Joya (for West's ex-wife Jewel Carmen) that took up the rest of the second floor. The third floor, hexagonally shaped, had a dance floor and bandstand. It attracted a diverse clientele of Hollywood celebrities, and many tourists.

Personal life 
Todd was briefly married to Pat DiCiccio, who supposedly had ties to the mob. The relationship was volatile with DiCiccio being very abusive to Todd, resulting in her filing for divorce and changing her will to only leaving him $1.

Death
On the morning of Monday, December 16, 1935, Todd was found dead, wearing a mauve and silver gown, mink wrap and expensive jewelry, in her chocolate-colored 1934 Lincoln Phaeton convertible inside the garage of Jewel Carmen, a former actress and former wife of Todd's lover and business partner Roland West. Carmen's house was approximately a block from the topmost side of Todd's restaurant. Her death was determined to have been caused by carbon monoxide poisoning. West is quoted in a contemporaneous newspaper account as having locked her out, which may have caused her to seek refuge and warmth in the car. Todd had a wide circle of friends and associates and a busy social life.

Police investigations revealed that she had spent the previous Saturday night (December 14) at the Trocadero, a popular Hollywood restaurant, at a party hosted by entertainer Stanley Lupino and his actress daughter Ida. She had a brief but unpleasant exchange there with her ex-husband, Pat DiCicco. However, her friends stated that she was in good spirits and were aware of nothing in her life that suggested a reason for her to commit suicide. She was driven home from the party in the early hours of December 15 by her chauffeur, Ernest O. Peters.

LAPD detectives concluded that Todd's death was accidental, the result of her either warming up the car to drive it or using the heater to keep herself warm. A coroner's inquest into the death was held on December 18, 1935. Autopsy surgeon A. P. Wagner testified that there were "no marks of violence anywhere upon or within the body" with only a "superficial contusion on the lower lip." There are informal accounts of greater signs of injury. The jury ruled that the death appeared accidental, but recommended "further investigation to be made into the case, by proper authorities."

A grand jury probe was subsequently held to determine whether Todd was murdered. After four weeks of testimony, the inquiry concluded with no evidence of foul play. The case was closed by the Homicide Bureau, which declared the death "accidental with possible suicide tendencies."  However, investigators found no motive for suicide, and Todd left no suicide note.

Todd's memorial service was held at Pierce Brothers Mortuary at 720 West Washington Blvd in Los Angeles. The body was cremated. After her mother's death in 1969, Todd's remains were placed in her mother's casket and buried in Bellevue Cemetery in her hometown of Lawrence, Massachusetts.

Legacy
For her contribution to the motion picture industry, Todd has a star on the Hollywood Walk of Fame at 6262 Hollywood Blvd.

Filmography

See also
 Jewel Carmen § Death of Thelma Todd
 List of unsolved deaths
 Pitts and Todd
 Patsy Kelly
 White Hot: The Mysterious Murder of Thelma Todd, 1991 TV movie

Further reading

References

External links

 
 
 
 

1906 births
1935 deaths
20th-century American actresses
Actresses from Massachusetts
Accidental deaths in California
American film actresses
American silent film actresses
Burials in Massachusetts
Deaths from carbon monoxide poisoning
Hal Roach Studios actors
People from Lawrence, Massachusetts
Unsolved deaths in the United States
University of Massachusetts Lowell alumni
American people of Canadian descent
American people of Irish descent
1935 suicides